1st Government of Slovenia was elected on 16 May 1990 and was in office until 14 May 1992, when 2nd Government (1st of Janez Drnovšek) was elected. Prime Minister was Lojze Peterle.

Government was formed by the coalition Democratic Opposition of Slovenia (Demos), which composed of five parties: Slovene Christian Democrats (SKD), Slovenian Social Democratic Union (SDZS), Slovenian Democratic Union (SDZ), Farmers' Alliance (SLS) and Greens of Slovenia (ZS).

Members

See also 

 List of governments of Slovenia

References 

Cabinets of Slovenia
1990 establishments in Slovenia
1992 disestablishments in Slovenia
Cabinets established in 1990
Cabinets disestablished in 1992